Evander Holyfield vs. George Foreman, billed as The Battle of the Ages, was a professional boxing match contested on April 19, 1991 for the WBA, WBC, and IBF heavyweight championships.

Background
On October 25, 1990, Evander Holyfield defeated James "Buster" Douglas by third round knockout to become the Undisputed Heavyweight Champion. Prior to his match with Douglas, Holyfield delayed a potential fight with Mike Tyson, instead agreeing to face 42-year-old George Foreman for the titles should he defeat Douglas. Since ending his 10-year retirement in 1987, Foreman was a perfect 24–0, with 23 of his wins coming via knockout. With Foreman's popularity at an all-time high coupled with the fact that he could possibly become the oldest Heavyweight champion in boxing history, anticipation for the bout was high. As such, the two fighters received high payouts, Holyfield was guaranteed $20 million, while Foreman took home a guaranteed $12.5 million. Despite his age, the outspoken Foreman remained confident that he could dethrone Holyfield and in the months before the fight often said as much in the media. Not to be outdone, Holyfield's manager Dan Duva lampooned Foreman's weight, infamously stating that the fight should be called "The Real Deal" vs. "The Big Meal" and "Some people say George is as fit as a fiddle. But I think he looks more like a cello."

The fight
The fight is perhaps best remembered for its memorable round 7. At the beginning of the round, Holyfield was the aggressor, throwing several jabs as Foreman stood back, seemingly waiting for an opportunity to land a powerful right hand. Seconds later, Holyfield missed with a left hook, which led to Foreman countering with a big right hook to Holyfield's head. Foreman would then become the aggressor and continue his attack on Holyfield, landing several punches within the round's first minute. As the second minute of the round began, Holyfield rebounded and proceeded to land a 15-second, multiple punch combination that staggered Foreman. Though Holyfield's barrage of punches seemed to tire Foreman, he nevertheless was able to survive the remainder of the round without going down. This round was ultimately named "Round of the Year" by The Ring magazine. Though Foreman was able to stay competitive throughout the fight, Holyfield ultimately won the fight via unanimous decision, winning all three judges scorecards by scores of 116–111, 115–112, and 117–110. Foreman, however, impressed many by going the distance with the much younger champion.

Aftermath
The fight was a huge success financially, becoming for a time the highest-grossing boxing match of all time. The bout brought in approximately $55 million from pay-per-view buys, with 1.45 million American homes purchasing the fight. Also, an additional $8 million was made from the live gate, with an estimated 19,000 fans attending the fight live.

Many thought this would be Foreman's last chance at the Heavyweight championship. Foreman, however, would shock the boxing world over three years later by defeating Michael Moorer to become the oldest Heavyweight champion at age 45.

References

1991 in boxing
Boxing on HBO
1991 in sports in New Jersey
Foreman
World Boxing Association heavyweight championship matches
World Boxing Council heavyweight championship matches
International Boxing Federation heavyweight championship matches
April 1991 sports events in the United States
Boxing matches at Boardwalk Hall